Erik Roberto Silva do Nascimento (born 2 February 1995), or simply Erik, is a Brazilian professional footballer who plays as a forward for Vitória. Erik is best known for his finishing and dribbling ability

Career statistics

Honours 
Luverdense
 Copa Verde: 2017

References

External links
 
 Erik at playmakerstats.com (English version of ogol.com.br)

1995 births
Living people
Sportspeople from Rio Grande do Sul
Brazilian footballers
Brazilian expatriate footballers
Association football forwards
Campeonato Brasileiro Série A players
Campeonato Brasileiro Série B players
Campeonato Brasileiro Série C players
Primeira Liga players
Grêmio Foot-Ball Porto Alegrense players
Veranópolis Esporte Clube Recreativo e Cultural players
Esporte Clube Juventude players
Clube Esportivo Lajeadense players
Luverdense Esporte Clube players
C.D. Aves players
Clube de Regatas Brasil players
Brazilian expatriate sportspeople in Portugal
Expatriate footballers in Portugal
People from Três Rios